Rezza Octavia (born 25 October 2000) is an Indonesian archer. She competed in the Women's individual event at the 2021 Islamic Solidarity Games.

References

2000 births
Living people
People from Sidoarjo Regency
Sportspeople from East Java
Indonesian female archers
Southeast Asian Games gold medalists for Indonesia
Southeast Asian Games medalists in archery
Competitors at the 2021 Southeast Asian Games
Islamic Solidarity Games medalists in archery
21st-century Indonesian women